Bolshoye Gorodishche is a rural locality (a selo) and the administrative center of Bolshegorodishchenskoye Rural Settlement, Shebekinsky District, Belgorod Oblast, Russia. The population was 724 as of 2010. There are 9 streets.

Geography 
Bolshoye Gorodishche is located 42 km northeast of Shebekino (the district's administrative centre) by road. Strelitsa-Vtoraya is the nearest rural locality.

References 

Rural localities in Shebekinsky District